Rodrigo Lima (born May 9, 1991) is a Brazilian mixed martial artist who competed in Bellator's bantamweight division, as well as in smaller promotions.

Mixed martial arts career

Early career: Watch Out Combat Show
Lima started his professional career in 2008. He fought mainly for Brazilian promotion Watch Out Combat Show. There he compiled a record of ten victories and no losses.

In 2011, Lima signed with Bellator to compete in the bantamweight tournament.

Bellator MMA
Lima made his debut on April 6, 2012 at Bellator 64 in the quarterfinal match of Bellator season six bantamweight tournament against Hiroshi Nakamura. Lima lost for the first time via unanimous decision (29-27, 29–27, 29-27).

Lima faced Ronnie Mann on March 28, 2013 at Bellator 94. Lima defeated Mann via unanimous decision (30-27, 30–27, 30-27) and earned a spot in Bellator 2013 summer series bantamweight tournament.

In the semifinal, Lima faced Rafael Silva on July 31, 2013 at Bellator 97. He lost via submission due to a rear-naked choke in the third round.

Mixed martial arts record

|-
|Win
|align=center|13–4
|Rolando Velasco
|Submission (guillotine choke)
|Tachi Palace Fights 33
|
|align=center|2
|align=center|3:47
|Lemoore, California, United States
|
|-
|Loss
|align=center|12–4
|Shawn Bunch
|Decision (unanimous)
|Conquer FC 4
|
|align=center|3
|align=center|5:00
|Richmond, California, United States
|
|-
|Win
|align=center|12–3
|Matt Betzold
|Decision (unanimous)
|Legacy FC 40
|
|align=center|3
|align=center|5:00
|Atlanta, Georgia, United States
|
|-
|Loss
|align=center|11–3
|Keith Richardson
|Submission (arm-triangle choke)
|Fight Lab 43
|
|align=center|3
|align=center|N/A
|North Carolina, United States
|
|-
|Loss
|align=center|11–2
|Rafael Silva
|Submission (rear-naked choke)
|Bellator 97
|
|align=center|3
|align=center|2:03
|Rio Rancho, New Mexico, United States
|Bellator 2013 summer series bantamweight tournament semifinal.
|-
|Win
|align=center|11–1
|Ronnie Mann
|Decision (unanimous)
|Bellator 94
|
|align=center|3
|align=center|5:00
|Tampa, Florida, United States
|
|-
|Loss
|align=center|10–1
|Hiroshi Nakamura
|Decision (unanimous)
|Bellator 64
|
|align=center|3
|align=center|5:00
|Windsor, Ontario, Canada
|Bellator season 6 bantamweight tournament quarterfinal.
|-
|Win
|align=center|10–0
|Denison Silva
|TKO (punches)
|Watch Out Combat Show 15
|
|align=center|1
|align=center|2:39
|Rio de Janeiro, Brazil
|
|-
|Win
|align=center|9–0
|Jeferson Hall
|Submission (guillotine choke)
|Watch Out Combat Show 15
|
|align=center|1
|align=center|0:27
|Rio de Janeiro, Brazil
|
|-
|Win
|align=center|8–0
|Heliovanio da Silva
|Submission (rear-naked choke)
|Watch Out Combat Show 13
|
|align=center|1
|align=center|2:22
|Brasília, Brazil
|
|-
|Win
|align=center|7–0
|D'Angelo de Souza Vieira
|Submission (bulldog choke)
|Watch Out Combat Show 10
|
|align=center|1
|align=center|3:44
|Rio de Janeiro, Brazil
|
|-
|Win
|align=center|6–0
|Mauricio dos Santos Jr.
|Decision (unanimous)
|Brasil Fight 2: Minas Gerais vs. Rio de Janeiro
|
|align=center|3
|align=center|5:00
|Belo Horizonte, Minas Gerais, Brazil
|
|-
|Win
|align=center|5–0
|Bruno Emílio
|KO (punch)
|Watch Out Combat Show 8
|
|align=center|1
|align=center|N/A
|Rio de Janeiro, Brazil
|
|-
|Win
|align=center|4–0
|Luiz Carlos Gomes
|TKO (retirement)
|Watch Out Combat Show 7
|
|align=center|1
|align=center|N/A
|Rio de Janeiro, Brazil
|
|-
|Win
|align=center|3–0
|Leandro Feijão
|Submission (armbar)
|Watch Out Combat Show 6
|
|align=center|1
|align=center|0:24
|Rio de Janeiro, Brazil
|
|-
|Win
|align=center|2–0
|Eduardo Feliciano
|Submission (arm-triangle choke)
|Watch Out Combat Show 3
|
|align=center|1
|align=center|3:06
|Rio de Janeiro, Brazil
|
|-
|Win
|align=center|1–0
|Richard Medeiros
|Decision (unanimous)
|Watch Out Combat Show 1
|
|align=center|2
|align=center|5:00
|Rio de Janeiro, Brazil
|

Mixed martial arts amateur record

|-
|Win
|align=center|4–0
|Jamilson Silva
|Decision (unanimous)
|Watch Out Combat Show 4
|
|align=center|3
|align=center|5:00
|Rio de Janeiro, Brazil
|
|-
|Win
|align=center|3–0
|Bruno Antunes
|Submission (rear-naked choke)
|Rio FC 2
|
|align=center|1
|align=center|N/A
|Rio de Janeiro, Brazil
|
|-
|Win
|align=center|2–0
|Antonio Roberto
|Decision (unanimous)
|Rio FC 2
|
|align=center|2
|align=center|N/A
|Rio de Janeiro, Brazil
|
|-
|Win
|align=center|1–0
|Caio Conceição
|Decision (unanimous)
|Watch Out Combat Show 2
|
|align=center|3
|align=center|5:00
|Rio de Janeiro, Brazil
|

References

1991 births
Living people
Sportspeople from Rio de Janeiro (city)
Brazilian male mixed martial artists
Bantamweight mixed martial artists
Mixed martial artists utilizing Brazilian jiu-jitsu
Brazilian practitioners of Brazilian jiu-jitsu
People awarded a black belt in Brazilian jiu-jitsu